Daewoo Express is an inter-city common carrier of passengers by bus serving over 60 destinations in Pakistan. Its headquarters are in Lahore.

History 
A timeline of the operations and beginnings of Daewoo Express Ltd:

 December 1997 - incorporated
 April 1998 - beginning of express bus operations
 November 1999 - beginning of city bus operations
 January 2004 - taken over by Sammi Corporation, Seoul, Korea

35 cities on 43 destinations with over 322 buses.

Services

Express bus service 
Daewoo Express Bus Service is the main operation of the company. The company provides long-distance time-efficient bus services to all major cities within Pakistan. With its headquarters in Lahore, the company operates its service from 31 cities in Pakistan, covering more than 40 destinations extending almost to the entire Punjab, Sindh and Khyber Pakhtunkhwa provinces. The service provides direct competition against airlines as well as the rail network. There is also a shuttle/drop off service that runs off the main express buses to allow passengers hassle-free travel to their neighbourhood. Recently, Daewoo shifted its routes From Lahore and Islamabad to Karachi via Motorway M-5.

Daewoo Express bus fleet includes:

 Daewoo BH116
 Daewoo BH120F
 Daewoo BX212
 Volvo Marcopolo B11R
 Hyundai Universe Noble
 Yutong Nova ZK6138HP
 Yutong Charisma ZK6122HL
 Golden Dragon "Daewoo Dragon"
 Golden Dragon Triumph High Decker

Cab service
Daewoo Pakistan started its cab service in Lahore and Rawalpindi in May 2014, essentially as an affordable cab service to facilitate Daewoo Express bus passengers only. With a fleet of over 200 vehicles, Daewoo Cab now provides point-to-point and inter-city cab service in Lahore, Rawalpindi, Islamabad, Multan, Faisalabad, Peshawar, Abbottabad, Sialkot, Swat, Sukkur, Karachi and Quetta. During the summer season, it also operates from the northern regions of Pakistan.

City bus service 

Daewoo City Bus was the first environmental and technological revolution in the urban transport sector within Pakistan. The buses were introduced with more advanced and powerful engines with TECHO monitoring systems in 1999. Air conditioning, announcement system and stopping signals were introduced. Since 1998, the city bus service has operated four routes within the city covering all the localities while one suburban route operated for Sheikhupura.

Cargo service 
Daewoo Express's cargo and courier service namely Daewoo Fastex is set up adjacent to all terminals and functions 24 hours a day, providing safe and quick dispatch and delivery of cargo consignments to terminals and homes. The cargo volume has over the years been increasing more rapidly than the expansions of the bus passenger operations.

Areas served

Khyber Pakhtunkhwa 
 Peshawar
 Nowshera
 Mardan
 Mingora, Swat
 Abbottabad
 Batkhela
 Dera Ismail Khan
 Haripur
 Kohat
 Barikot, Swat

Punjab 

 Ahmadpur East Tehsil
 Bahawalpur
 Bhakkar
 Bhalwal
 Chashma
 Chichawatni
 D.G.Khan
 Dunyapur Tehsil
 Faisalabad
 Gujranwala
 Gujrat
 Islamabad
 Jehanian
 Jhang
 Jhelum
 Khanewal
 Khanpur
 Lahore
 Lodhran
 Mian Channu
 Mianwali
 Multan
 Murree
 Muzaffargarh
 Okara
 Rahim Yar Khan
 Rawalpindi
 Sadiqabad
 Sahiwal
 Sargodha
 Sialkot
 Talagang

Sindh 
 Daharki
 Hyderabad
 Karachi
 Moro
 Sukkur
 Sakrand

See also 
 Buses in Pakistan
 Transport in Pakistan

References

External links
Official Website 
TCS Tracking
Daewoo Rawalpindi to [Karachi Review]

Transport in Lahore
Bus transport in Pakistan
Transport companies established in 1999
1999 establishments in Pakistan
Daewoo
Pakistan–South Korea relations
Pakistani subsidiaries of foreign companies
Bus companies of Pakistan
Companies based in Lahore